Affinity  is a 2008 UK film adaptation of Sarah Waters' 1999 novel of the same name; directed by Tim Fywell and written by Andrew Davies. It stars Zoë Tapper, Anna Madeley, Domini Blythe, Amanda Plummer, and Mary Jo Randle. The film was nominated for the GLAAD Media Award for Outstanding TV Movie or Limited Series.

Premise
Affinity is set in Victorian England; the story of an upper-class woman, Margaret (Anna Madeley), who becomes an official "Visitor" to a woman's prison; however, she becomes emotionally attached to one of the inmates, Selina (Zoe Tapper).

As the story progresses through Selina's shady background, and Margaret's dislike of her home life; a plot to break out of the prison develops. But just what the plan is, and who calls the shots is yet to be discovered.

Cast
Zoë Tapper as Selina Dawes
Anna Madeley as Margaret Prior
Domini Blythe as Mother Prior
Amanda Plummer as Miss Ridley
Mary Jo Randle as Mrs Jelf
Caroline Loncq as Ruth Vigers
Anne Reid as Mrs Brink
Vincent Leclerc as Theophilus
Anna Massey as Miss Haxby
Ferelith Young as Helen
Sara Lloyd-Gregory as Madeleine
Brett Watson as Stephen Prior
Candis Nergaard as Black Eyed Sue
Kenneth Hadley as Prison Porter
Sarah Crowden as Ada
Nickolas Grace as Mr Hither
Paul Clayton as Mr Vincy

References

External links
 
 
 Affinity (2008), review at the Online Video Guide

2008 films
British romantic drama films
Films based on British novels
Lesbian-related films
2008 LGBT-related films
Films directed by Tim Fywell
2000s English-language films
British LGBT-related films
2000s British films